The 2003 Kansas City Royals season was a season in American baseball. It involved the Royals finishing third in the American League Central, with a record of 83 wins and 79 losses.  It was the only winning season for the franchise between 1994 and 2013.

2003 was a hopeful and promising winning season ("We Believe" was the slogan) for the Royals, as they begin the season winning their first 9 games, and the team spent 93 days in first place in the AL Central.  But the team faded down the stretch, falling out of first place for the last time on August 31, and were eliminated from playoff contention on September 23.

Offseason
October 15, 2002: AJ Hinch was released by the Kansas City Royals.
December 18, 2002: Buddy Carlyle was signed as a free agent with the Kansas City Royals.

Regular season

Opening Day starters
 Michael Tucker – CF
 Joe Randa – 3B
 Mike Sweeney – 1B
 Raúl Ibañez – LF
 Brandon Berger – RF
 Ken Harvey – DH
 Ángel Berroa – SS
 Brent Mayne – C 
 Carlos Febles – 2B

Season standings

Record vs. opponents

Roster

Player stats

Batting

Starters by position 
Note: Pos = Position; G = Games played; AB = At bats; H = Hits; Avg. = Batting average; HR = Home runs; RBI = Runs batted in

Other batters 
Note: G = Games played; AB = At bats; H = Hits; Avg. = Batting average; HR = Home runs; RBI = Runs batted in

Pitching

Starting pitchers 
Note: G = Games pitched; IP = Innings pitched; W = Wins; L = Losses; ERA = Earned run average; SO = Strikeouts

Other pitchers 
Note: G = Games pitched; IP = Innings pitched; W = Wins; L = Losses; ERA = Earned run average; SO = Strikeouts

Relief pitchers 
Note: G = Games pitched; W = Wins; L = Losses; SV = Saves; ERA = Earned run average; SO = Strikeouts

Farm system 

LEAGUE CHAMPIONS: AZL Royals Blue

Notes

References 
2003 Kansas City Royals team page at Baseball Reference
2003 Kansas City Royals team page at www.baseball-almanac.com

Kansas City Royals seasons
Kansas City Royals season
Kansas City Royals